Filip is a 2022 Polish war drama film, directed by Michał Kwieciński. It is based on the semi-biographical novel of the same name by Leopold Tyrmand (Filip, 1961).

Plot 
The film takes place in 1943. With A young Polish Jew named Filip, FIlip is a cosmopolitan and incapable of deeper feelings seducer. In Poland, Filip lost his entire family. Alone - being in the heart of Nazi Germany. Filip hides his Jewish origins and often eludes death. Filip works as a waiter in a restaurant of an exclusive hotel and carelessly enjoys all the charms of life surrounded by luxury, beautiful women and friends from all over Europe. However, when the war begins to take a bloody toll on those closest to him, the intricately built world that surrounds him crumbles like a house of cards.

Cast 

 Eryk Kulm Jr. as Filip
 Victor Meutelet as Pierre
  as Lisa
 Zoë Straub as Blanka
 Sandra Drzymalska as Marlena
 Maja Szopa as Sara
  as Baumuller
 Bohdan Graczyk as Eissler
 Werner Biermeier as Brutsch
 Ondrej Kraus as Bohumil
 Joseph Altamura as Francesco
 Tom van Kessel as Lucas
 Mateusz Rzeźniczak (aktor)|Mateusz Rzeźniczak as Laszlo
 Karol Biskup as Artur
 Nicolas Przygoda as Ilie
 Philip Günsch as Jupp
 Robert Więckiewicz as Staszek
 Julian Świeżewski as Kazik
 Jürg Plüss as Gukst
 Nicolo Pasetti as Karl
 Christine Detmers as Elsa
 Anke Sabrina Beerman as Greta
 Zofia Cybul as Annemarie
 Ada Szczepaniak as Marta
 Hanna Śleszyńska as Diva
 Edyta Torhan as Filip's mother
 Robert Gonera as Filip's father

Reception 
The film was first shown at the Gdynia Film Festival in September 2022, where it won the Silver Lion, and also awards to Michał Sobociński for cinematography and to Dariusz Krysiak for characterization. The actor playing the lead role, Erik Kulm Jr. received the Zbyszek Cybulski Award for a young actor of outstanding individuality in December 2022. The film was also presented at the Santa Barbara International Film Festival in 2023, which was its international premiere. Filip also received the highest award (Platinum Gorget) on March 1, 2023 during the III Festival of National Culture "Pamięć i Tożsamość" in Warsaw.

In his review, Jakub Majmurek appreciates the skill of the filmmakers in telling a full-blooded story in a modern style, as well as focusing, which is rare in Polish historical cinema, on the personal experience of a particular character rather than a grand narrative. Majmurek emphasizes the biopolitical nature of the story. The Nazi authorities in the film are mainly interested in the sexual morality of German women, while Philip is "a Jew who, in the midst of the Holocaust, refuses to die" and decides to enjoy life. Of the film's drawbacks, he mentions that at times it reverberates with misogynistic tones, and that it "lacks the closure that would have made a truly weighty and important work out of a good film offering a fresh look at a historical subject with an outstanding title role by Erik Kulm."

Summary 
Despite being a Polish film the language is in German with some French and Polish thrown in. It also has a really good representation of how Germany looked in the 1940s.

References

External links 
 

Polish war drama films
Polish films